The Hunterdon County Vocational School District is a technical and vocational public school district serving students in ninth through twelfth grades and adult learners, located in Flemington, and serving the entire Hunterdon County, New Jersey, United States community.

Students attend the district's school on a half-day basis for specialized training in 11 core program areas, starting in their sophomore year. Most standard academic courses are taken at the student's home high school.

As of the 2017-18 school year, the district and its three schools had an enrollment of 140 students and 17.5 classroom teachers (on an FTE basis), for a student–teacher ratio of 8.0:1.

Schools
Hunterdon County Polytech Career Academy served 133 students as of the 2017-18 school year at:
Bartles Corner Campus off Bartles Corner Road
Central Campus next to the Hunterdon Central High School Field House

Administration
Core members of the district's administration are:
Dr. Todd Bonsall, Superintendent
Corinne Steinmetz, Business Administrator

References

External links
Hunterdon County Polytech Career Academy

Data for Hunterdon County Vocational School District, National Center for Education Statistics

Flemington, New Jersey
New Jersey District Factor Group none
School districts in Hunterdon County, New Jersey
Vocational school districts in New Jersey